St. Francis Xavier Cathedral, Hyderabad, Pakistan is the cathedral church of the Roman Catholic Diocese of Hyderabad, 1040 kilometers south of the Capital Islamabad.

Father Francis Kotwani, the first Sindhi to be ordained a Catholic priest, served as assistant parish priest of the cathedral parish. He completed 50 years as a priest in 1994.

Bishop Max John Rodrigues of Hyderabad appealed for people to pray for the country at the conclusion of a special Mass at the cathedral, offered following a declaration of a state of emergency and a rash of arrests in the country in November 2007.

In September 2012, an anti-Islamic film, unrelated to the cathedral, or the Catholic Church in any form, resulted in angry protest marches for three days, during which Christian institutions and buildings were targeted. Fr. Samson Shukardin OFM, Vicar General of the Diocese, reported that a crowd went by St. Francis Xavier Cathedral, throwing stones and breaking windows. From the upper floors of some nearby houses, shots were also fired at the cathedral door.

In August 2020, Bishop Samson Shukardin OFM ordained to the priesthood Fr Sunil Ashraf and Father Perkho Sono OFM, in the cathedral.

References

Hyderabad
Buildings and structures in Hyderabad, Sindh